Carl Devlies (born 23 January 1953) is a Belgian politician. He is a member of the Flemish Christian-democratic party. At the moment he is a schepen in Leuven.

Devlies was born in Amsterdam.

Career
2002–2008: Member of the Chamber of Representatives
2008–2011: State Secretary for Coordination of Fraud Prevention
2011–2013: Member of the Chamber of Representatives
2011–present: Schepen in Leuven

External links

1953 births
Living people
Politicians from Amsterdam
21st-century Belgian politicians